"Message" / "Personal" is a double A-side single by Japanese singer Aya Ueto off her second studio album, Message. It was released by Flight Master on May 14, 2003.

Background
"Message" was written by Yuho Iwasato, composed by Hal, and arranged and produced by Sin. The song was used in commercials for Kao deodorant 8×4, starring Ueto herself. Ueto has stated that "Message" is one of her personal favorite songs of hers. The release of the single coincided with the start of Ueto's first concert tour, Ueto Aya First Live Tour Pureness 2003, and the premiere of her first feature film, Azumi.

"Personal" was written, composed, arranged and produced by T2ya. The song is composed in the key of B minor and set to a tempo of 92 beats per minute. Ueto's vocals span from A3 to D5

Chart performance
"Message" / "Personal" entered the daily Oricon Singles Chart at number 5, where it also peaked. The single debuted at number 10 on the weekly chart, selling 18,000 copies in the first week, and at number 9 on the SoundScan singles chart. "Message" / "Personal" charted on the Oricon Singles Chart for six weeks, selling a reported total of 28,000 copies during its run.

Track listing

Credits and personnel

"Message"
 Sin – producer, keyboards and programming
 Yūho Iwasato - songwriter
 HΛL - songwriter
 Hideyuki Fukasawa - synthesizer
 Kenji Suzuki - guitar
 Chieko Kinbara - strings
 Kumiko Yoshida - chorus
 Hironobu Asano – engineering, audio mixing
 Nao Yoshida - production coordinator

"Personal"
 T2ya – songwriter, producer, keyboards and programming
 Naoki Hayashibe - guitar
 Yumi Kawamura - chorus
 Yasuyuki Hara – engineering
 Jun'nosuke Sato – engineering
 Hironobu Asano – audio mixing

Credits adapted from Best of Uetoaya: Single Collection album liner notes.

Charts

Sales

Release history

References

2003 songs
2003 singles
Aya Ueto songs
Songs used as jingles
Songs with lyrics by Yuho Iwasato
Song recordings produced by Sin (music producer)